Lee Soo-mi (born March 3, 1989), professionally known by her stage name Lee Seo-an, is a South Korean actress and singer. She debuted as a new member of SeeYa in 2009 and left the group due to being included in a new group line-up Coed School in 2010 by Core Contents Media and also debuted with the girl group F-ve Dolls in 2011. In 2012, Lee terminated her contracts with Core Contents Media and signed D-Business Entertainment in 2013 to pursue her solo career. After taking a break for three-years, Lee transitioned into acting appearing on China IQIYI's Teacher Good Night in 2016.

Early life 
Lee auditioned for "SBS's Young Jae Yook Sung Project" in 2001 and won but never became a trainee. She attended the Korea Aerospace University and graduated in Aeronautical Science & Flight Operations.

Career

2009–2013: SeeYa, COED School, F-ve Dolls, and solo activities
She joined SeeYa in 2009 after Nam Gyuri left the group to pursue a solo career. She was added in October 2009 and released a mini album with the group called Rebloom. She stated that she will work hard to become like her Seeya unnies. During her time with Seeya they released a song with members of T-ara and Davichi called Wonder Women as a single. She was featured in the video as well.

On July 23, 2010 she was dropped out from Seeya to become the leader of the new group Coed School. That consisted of 4 girls and 6 guys which made up 10. She stated in an interview that it was hard for her to become a leader for a group, when she only was a maknae for the group Seeya. She also stated the hair changes from when in Seeya and Coed. Also she lost weight about a total of 4 kg. She stated "I danced since my days with Seeya, so there wasn't a lot of pressure. But the 20-hour rehearsal times really tired me out. I lost about 4 kg." Also that her genre from previous balled and on too Pop music was something she enjoyed because she loved both. She also stated "I liked acting cute and being loved as the maknae when I was with my Seeya unnis. It's fun with Coed because we're all similar in age, but since I'm the leader, I have to earn to take more responsibility and manage a lot more things." she was very responsible and manage to bring the best to Co-ed School. She was on the drama Miss Ripley as the role of Jo Eun Bum. At the same time she couldn't be on the show with her group F-ve Dolls who were on the drama The Greatest Love because the filming was at the same time.

By mid-2011 Coed School split and became subunits, and Lee was placed in F-ve Dolls with the other 3 girls and one new one, She kept her leader status for F-ve Dolls from being the leader in Co-Ed. By 2013 Co-ed was no longer active and Lee remained in F-ve Dolls until 2012 and wanted to become solo. She left Core Contents Media along with Heo Chanmi the same year.

In December 2013, Lee was featured as the female protagonist in the music video "It's You" by R&B balled group D-Unit. Also in 2013, she signed with D-Business Entertainment to become an actress and solo artist. Where she is housed with artist like C-LUV, Digital Masta and formerly D-UNIT, and 1Punch.

2016–present: Transition into acting
Lee were cast in China drama IQIYI's Teacher Good Night in 2016. Lee also changes her stage name to Lee Seo-an.

Discography

Filmography

Dramas

References

External links 
 https://twitter.com/#!/leesumi00
 https://instagram.com/leesumi00/
 http://www.cyworld.com/leenike
 http://minihp.cyworld.com/pims/main/pims_main.asp?tid=51447895

1989 births
Living people
MBK Entertainment artists
People from Seongnam
21st-century South Korean actresses
South Korean female dancers
South Korean female idols
South Korean women pop singers